Frisbie Island is an island in Delaware County, New York. It is located west-southwest of Lordville, on the Delaware River.

References

River islands of New York (state)
Landforms of Delaware County, New York
Islands of the Delaware River